Après Ski is an American reality television series which premiered on the Bravo cable network, on November 2, 2015. Announced in June 2014, the series chronicles the personal and professional lives of a group of people working in a luxurious concierge company located in Whistler, British Columbia, a Canadian resort town.

Episodes

Broadcast 
The show premiered on November 2, 2015, in the United States on the Bravo cable network at 10/9 p.m. ET/PT, following the season premiere of Vanderpump Rules. Internationally, the series premiered in Australia on Arena within 24 hours of the American broadcast on November 3, 2015.

See also

References

External links 
 
 
 

2010s American reality television series
2015 American television series debuts
2015 American television series endings
Bravo (American TV network) original programming
English-language television shows